Traveller Referee Screen is a 1979 role-playing game supplement for Traveller published by Judges Guild.

Contents
Traveller Referee Screen contains important tables from Traveller Books 1-4 concerning combat, encounters, psionic use and starship maneuvers.

Referee Screen is a GM's screen with charts and tables from Traveller plus weapons data from Book 4, Mercenary.

Publication history
The first of Judges Guild's licenses with companies other than TSR was for GDW's Traveller game. Following their original methodology of publishing gaming aids, Judges Guild rapidly put out a referee screen (1978), a character creation aid (1979), and a book of deck plans (1979).

Referee Screen was published by Judges Guild in 1979 as four cardstock pieces.

Reception
Bob McWilliams reviewed Traveller Referee Screen for White Dwarf #15, giving it an overall rating of 7 out of 10, and stated that "this is a useful though not essential purchase."

William A. Barton reviewed Traveller Referee Screen in The Space Gamer No. 36. Barton commented that "the Traveller Referee Screen will make for smoother play in even the wildest campaign."

References

Gamemaster's screens
Judges Guild publications
Role-playing game supplements introduced in 1979
Traveller (role-playing game) supplements